Let My Children Hear Music is an album released by Columbia Records in 1972 of music by composer Charles Mingus, produced by Teo Macero. The music is scored for large jazz orchestra and Mingus worked with several arrangers, orchestrators and conductors, most notably Sy Johnson and Alan Raph, to realize some of his most ambitious compositions. In the original liner notes, Mingus described it as "the best album I have ever made".

Mingus was nominated for the 1973 Grammy Award for Best Album Notes (Non-Classical) for the album, losing to Tom T. Hall for Tom T. Hall's Greatest Hits.

Track listing
All tracks composed by Charles Mingus.

 "The Shoes of the Fisherman's Wife Are Some Jiveass Slippers" – 9:34
 "Adagio ma Non Troppo" – 8:22
 "Don't Be Afraid, the Clown's Afraid Too" – 9:26
 "Taurus in the Arena of Life" – 4:17 (on CD reissue)
 "Hobo Ho" – 10:07
 "The Chill of Death" – 7:38
 "The I of Hurricane Sue" – 10:09

Personnel 
The soloists are listed below:
 Lonnie Hillyer - trumpet
 Julius Watkins - French horn
 Bobby Jones - tenor saxophone
 Joe Wilder - trumpet
 Charles McCracken - cello
 Charles McPherson - alto saxophone
 James Moody - tenor saxophone
 Sir Roland Hanna - piano
 Snooky Young - lead trumpet throughout
 Dannie Richmond - drums

References

Charles Mingus albums
1972 albums
Albums produced by Teo Macero
Columbia Records albums